Lindsay Lee-Waters and Megan Moulton-Levy were the defending champions, but lost in the Quarterfinals to Macall Harkins and Ahsha Rolle. 
Alexa Glatch and Asia Muhammad won the title by defeating Grace Min and Melanie Oudin in the final 4–6, 6–3, [10–2].

Seeds

Draw

Draw

References
 Main Draw

Coleman Vision Tennis Championships - Doubles
Coleman Vision Tennis Championships
2011 Coleman Vision Tennis Championships